Minster railway station serves the village of Minster in Kent and surrounding villages.

Facilities 
The station, and all trains serving it, are operated by Southeastern. On the Ramsgate-bound platform, there is a ticket machine offering a full range of tickets. The former booking office is still standing but no longer in use.

History 
The station was opened on 13 April 1846 by the South Eastern Railway (SER) on the Ashford to Ramsgate (via Canterbury West) line. To the east is the junction station for the SER branch line to Deal via Sandwich - itself opened on 1 July 1847.

Originally there was no connection for trains running from Ramsgate SER Station to Deal and services were provided from a bay platform. Services from Sandwich and Deal terminated at Minster, where passengers then had to change trains for services towards Ramsgate. A connecting spur opened in October 1858 to resolve this issue.

Along with other stations along the line, electrification took place in 1962, with services beginning on 18 June. Goods services were withdrawn on 9 September 1963. A set of refuge sidings were retained, which closed later.

The station has had a number of names over its lifetime. It was renamed Minster Junction on 1 January 1852, then Minster Junction (Thanet) on 1 August 1901, Minster (Thanet) on 7 May 1945, and reverting to Minster around 1971.

Services 
All services at Minster are operated by Southeastern using  EMUs.

The typical off-peak service in trains per hour is:
 1 tph to London Charing Cross via 
 1 tph to 

During the peak hours, the station is also served by trains to London Cannon Street.

The station is also served by a single early morning service to London St Pancras International, operated by a  EMU.

References 
Citations

Sources

External links

Thanet
Former South Eastern Railway (UK) stations
Railway stations in Great Britain opened in 1846
Railway stations served by Southeastern
Railway stations in Kent
DfT Category F1 stations
1846 establishments in England